Rory Lawson (born 12 March 1981) is a Scottish former rugby union player who played his career in Scotland and England as a scrum half. He won 31 caps for Scotland.

He attended Dollar Academy where he captained the school's 1st XV. After a number of years playing amateur rugby for Heriots he then took a professional contract with Edinburgh Gunners in 2003 but in the summer of 2006 moved to the Guinness Premiership side Gloucester.

He gained his first international cap against Australia in the autumn of 2006, coming on as a substitute. He faced strong competition for the scrum-half position in the Scotland side from Mike Blair and Chris Cusiter, both of whom were British and Irish Lions. but still managed to captain Scotland. Lawson was a member of Scotland's 2007 Rugby World Cup squad. He joined Newcastle Falcons in 2012.

On 7 August 2013, Lawson announced his retirement from rugby on medical advice, due to a chronic wrist injury.

Personal life
A grandson of commentator Bill McLaren and son of Scottish international scrum-half Alan Lawson, Lawson comes from a sporting family. His brother Gregor played for Scotland 7's and fullback for London Scottish FC, and after retiring founded Morphsuits, a fancy dress company.  His cousin, Jim Thompson, is a fullback/centre with Edinburgh Rugby.

In 2018, he married India Lawson in East Lothian, Scotland. In 2019, they had a son together, Frederick Louis McLaren Lawson. In 2021, they welcomed another son, Louis James MacGregor Lawson.

References

External links
Gloucester Rugby Profile

1981 births
Living people
Commonwealth Games rugby sevens players of Scotland
Edinburgh Rugby players
Gloucester Rugby players
Heriot's RC players
Newcastle Falcons players
People educated at Dollar Academy
Rugby sevens players at the 2006 Commonwealth Games
Rugby union players from Dunfermline
Rugby union scrum-halves
Scotland international rugby union players
Scottish rugby union players